Gabriella Tóth (born 23 September 1996) is a Hungarian handball player for Mosonmagyaróvári KC SE and the Hungarian national team.

Achievements
EHF Champions League:
Finalist: 2016
Nemzeti Bajnokság I
Gold Medalist: 2016
Magyar Kupa
Gold Medalist: 2016

References

External links

1996 births
Living people
Hungarian female handball players
People from Berettyóújfalu
Győri Audi ETO KC players
Sportspeople from Hajdú-Bihar County